Transcarioca is a bus rapid transit (BRT) line in Rio de Janeiro, connecting Barra da Tijuca with Galeão International Airport. The Transcarioca line was the second line that opened on the Rio de Janeiro BRT system. Work on the line started in March 2011 and the official opening took place on June 1, 2014, just before the 2014 FIFA World Cup. Transcarioca is also a set of citybus lines that mainly operate in Barra da Tijuca.

See also

 Bus Rapid Transit in Brazil
List of bus rapid transit systems
TransOeste

External links
Official website

TransCarioca